TSC Arena is a football stadium in Bačka Topola, Serbia. It is the home ground of TSC Bačka Topola. The stadium consists of four stands with a total seating capacity of 4,500.

References

Football venues in Serbia
Bačka Topola